Dulwich College Singapore is an international school located in Singapore, which opened in 2014. As a branch of Dulwich College International, it offers a comprehensive programme for students aged 2 to 18 and is separated into three schools : DUCKS, Junior School and Senior School.

Academics 
Students from ages 2 to 7 are immersed in a dual-language environment, where classes are conducted in both English and Chinese. Daily Chinese classes are conducted for students from years 3 to 6 (aged 7 to 10).

Key facilities 
In August 2018, a performing arts centre at the college was completed, which includes a 742-seat theatre and a pipe organ which is second largest in Singapore, two black box theatres and suites of music and art rooms.

Sports facilities at the college include three swimming pools, a multi-purpose pitch, two gymnasiums, a dance studio, a fitness centre, tennis courts and cricket nets.

Additionally, there is dedicated IB centre including quiet study areas and a large common room with a kitchen area, three libraries, three dining rooms, a bike track and sustainable garden throughout the grounds.

With the Junior School Music Programme, students are initially taught a string instrument, then later offered an opportunity to change to wind or bass instrument.

See also 
 Dulwich College Beijing
 Dulwich College
 Dulwich College Suzhou
 Dulwich College Shanghai

References

External links 
Official website

International schools in Singapore
Dulwich College
2014 establishments in Singapore
British international schools in Asia
Educational institutions established in 2014